Horsfieldia fulva is a species of plant in the family Myristicaceae. It is a tree found in Sumatra and Peninsular Malaysia. It is threatened by habitat loss.

References

fulva
Trees of Sumatra
Trees of Peninsular Malaysia
Vulnerable plants
Taxonomy articles created by Polbot